This is a list of topics related to the theory of constraints.

B
 Bottleneck (production)
This is a resource that has enough capacity or more capacity when needed to satisfy the demand placed upon it.  Bottlenecks need not be taken into account when scheduling.

C
 Causality

E
 Eliyahu M. Goldratt
 Evaporating Cloud
 Event chain methodology

F
 Failure mode and effects analysis (FMEA)
 Focused improvement
 Future Reality Tree

G
 Game Theory
 The Goal (novel)
 Goldratt, Eliyahu M.

I
 It's Not Luck (novel)

L
 Lean Construction

M
 Meadows, Donella Twelve leverage points - protocols to intervene in a system

N
 Necessary and sufficient conditions
 Necessary But Not Sufficient (novel)

P
 POOGI
 Prerequisite Tree
 Project Management

R
 Reengineering
 Reverse hierarchy

S
 Strategy & Tactics (TOC)

T
 Thinking processes
 Throughput (business)
 Throughput
 Total quality management
 Transition Tree
 Twelve leverage points

See also
 Business philosophies and popular management theories
 List of management topics
 List of project management topics
 Management

 
Constraints, Theory of
Theory of Constraints topics